Yvon Pedneault is a French Canadian sports journalist and television and radio broadcaster from Chicoutimi, Quebec who is known for his coverage of ice hockey. Pedneault is the only person to have worked full-time for all three French-language Montreal daily papers, as well as every French-language television station that has carried Montreal Canadiens games. In 1998, he was awarded the Elmer Ferguson Memorial Award, an award given annually by the Hockey Hall of Fame to distinguished members of the newspaper profession.

Career

Early life and career
Yvon Pedneault joined the local newspaper in Chicoutimi in 1965 as the bowling writer. A year later, Pedneault was the sports editor for Progrès-Dimanche. In 1965, Pedneault moved to Montreal where he was hired by Jacques Beauchamp to be a hockey writer for the Montréal-Matin. With the Montréal-Matin, he covered the Montreal Canadiens and the Junior Canadiens, as well as the local horse racing scene. His work would also be published in two other daily newspapers during his career: La Presse, where he covered the Canadiens, and Le Journal de Montréal, where he was a hockey reporter and later served as their sports editor.

Notoriety
During his career, Pedneault would also cover the Canadiens on four different television stations in Montreal: Réseau des sports, Télévision de Radio-Canada, TVA and TQS. Because of this, Pedneault is the only person that has worked full-time for all three French-language Montreal daily papers, as well as every French-language television station that has carried Montreal Canadiens games.

Pedneault was host of one of North America's longest running sports talk, radio call-in shows, called "Les amateurs de sports" in the '70s on CKAC in Montreal (the program airs to this day).

Pedneault would also cover several Olympic games.

Pedneault also briefly served as the General Manager of Le Collège Français de Longueuil in the Quebec Major Junior Hockey League.

In 1998, he was awarded the Elmer Ferguson Memorial Award, an award given annually by the Hockey Hall of Fame to distinguished members of the newspaper profession.

Since 2005, he has been a member of the Hockey Hall of Fame selection committee.

Pedneault's highest profile work has been as colour commentator for Le Réseau des sports, TSN's French equivalent for the last ten years. Prior to the commencement of the 2008-2009 hockey season, RDS decided not to renew his contract due to salary demands and replaced him with former Canadiens player Benoît Brunet, who previously provided intermission commentary.

Pedneault provided commentary segments on some of the CBC Hockey Night in Canada Canadiens broadcasts despite his less than perfect English.  He also appears regularly as a panelist on the French language sports show 110% on TQS.

He is also well-known due to his popular catchphrase "C'est l'heure!" (It's time!) followed by a drill-like sound.

Yvon Pednault works since 2009 for the TVA network.

References

External links
 Yvon Pedneault at Réseau des sports (French)

Year of birth missing (living people)
Canadian sports journalists
Canadian television sportscasters
Elmer Ferguson Award winners
French Quebecers
Journalists from Quebec
Living people
Montreal Canadiens announcers
National Hockey League broadcasters